Diane Bertrand (born 20 November 1951) is a French film director and screenwriter. Her film Un samedi sur la terre was screened in the Un Certain Regard section at the 1996 Cannes Film Festival.

Selected filmography
 Charcuterie fine: Clin d'oeil au long métrage de Jeunet et Caro 'Delicatessen' (1991)
 25 décembre 58, 10h36 (1991)
 Un samedi sur la terre (1996)
 L'occasionnelle (1999)
 Retour de flamme (2002)
 L'Annulaire (2005)
 Baby Blues (2008)

References

External links

1951 births
Living people
French film directors
French women film directors
French women screenwriters
French screenwriters